The Stalin School of Falsification is a book written in 1937 by Russian revolutionary Leon Trotsky. Written after Trotsky's expulsion from the Soviet Union, the book contains a detailed account of how historians chosen by Joseph Stalin rewrote revolutionary history. A well-known example from the book concerns the revolutionary contributions by Trotsky himself about which Stalin had written glowingly in 1918, but whose special value he denied by 1924.

Publication history
A translation in English by Max Shachtman was published in 1937 by Pioneer Publishers. In 1974, New Park in London published another edition.

References

Works by Leon Trotsky